Run On or run-on may refer to:

 Run-on, in hydrology, the process or measure of surface water infiltration 
 Run-on sentence, a grammatical construction
 Nuclear run-on, a test to identify genes
 Run On (band)
 "God's Gonna Cut You Down" (also known as "Run On" or "Run On for a Long Time"), a folk song covered by many artists
 "Run On" (Moby song), 1999 song
 Run On (TV series), a South Korean television series

See also
 On the Run (disambiguation)